Port Said Indoor Hall is an Olympic-standard, multi-use indoor sporting arena located in Al-Zohour district in Port Said, Egypt.  The capacity of the arena is 5,000 spectators. Hosts competitions of Handball, Basketball and Volleyball.

It was built in time for the 1999 World Men's Handball Championship.

Indoor arenas in Egypt
Port Said
Handball venues in Egypt
Basketball venues in Egypt
Volleyball venues in Egypt
Sport in Port Said
1990s establishments in Egypt